Oarja is a commune in Argeș County, Muntenia, Romania. It is composed of two villages, Ceaușești and Oarja.

External links
Commune's website

References

Communes in Argeș County
Localities in Muntenia